Tulip Joshi is a former Indian actress and a businesswoman. She has appeared in Hindi, Kannada, Punjabi, Malayalam and Telugu films.

Early life
Joshi was born in Mumbai to a Gujarati Indian father and Armenian mother, Zabel Joshi (nee Haykian). Her sister Monalisa is married to actor Rajat Bedi. She was brought up in Mumbai where she attended the Jamnabai Narsee School, and later Mithibai College from where she graduated majoring food science and chemistry.

Tulip entered the Femina Miss India in 2000. She did not make it to the list of winners but was noticed by many advertising agencies. She appeared in a number of advertising campaigns for big brands (Ponds, Pepsi, Siyaram, BPL, Smirnoff, Tata Sky mobile TV, etc.). She also appeared in a video made as a tribute to Nusrat Fateh Ali Khan.

Film career
Joshi entered movies quite by chance. She was a friend of the bride of Aditya Chopra, the son of director Yash Chopra. The family noticed her at their wedding and asked her to appear for an audition, following which they cast her in Mere Yaar Ki Shaadi Hai opposite Uday Chopra.
Not being fluent in Hindi, she trained in Hindi diction and in acting at Feroz Khan's studio. She was also advised by the film-makers to change her name to something more Indian, as audiences might have difficulty in accepting a heroine with such an unconventional name. She chose the name Sanjana, she was playing the character of Anjali in that film. The film was quite a success. Despite the good reviews and success, Tulip was panned for her acting.

After a two-year hiatus, she reappeared in Matrubhoomi - a dark film about a futuristic world with almost no women. Her performance in it was praised and established her credibility as an actress. The movie Dhokha also gave her some recognition.

Reverting to her given name, Joshi next appeared in the Telugu film Villain. Her next Hindi movie was Dil Maange More with Shahid Kapoor, Ayesha Takia and Soha Ali Khan. The film got average reviews, but it was not a box office success.

She appeared in her first Punjabi film in 2009 called Jag Jeondeyan De Mele, with famous Punjabi singer and actor, Harbhajan Maan. She again acted with Harbhajan Mann in 2011 in Yaara O Dildaara, the Punjabi movie.

In 2010, she acted in a Kannada film directed by Upendra titled Super. The movie was a superhit in Kannada. This movie is also being dubbed in Telugu, Tamil and Hindi.

Joshi was seen in her next Punjabi film Jatt Airways, opposite Alfaaz, and directed by Harjeet Ricky. The movie was released on 30 August 2013.

Filmography

References

External links

 
 
 

21st-century Indian actresses
Indian film actresses
Indian voice actresses
Indian people of Armenian descent
Living people
Female models from Mumbai
Indian television actresses
Indian soap opera actresses
Actresses in Kannada cinema
Actresses in Punjabi cinema
Actresses in Hindi cinema
Actresses of European descent in Indian films
Mithibai College alumni
Actresses from Mumbai
Actresses in Malayalam cinema
Ethnic Armenian actresses
Year of birth missing (living people)
Gujarati people
Actresses in Telugu cinema